This is a list of prisons within Hunan province of the People's Republic of China.

Sources 
 

Buildings and structures in Hunan
Hunan